The 2006–07 Bulgarian Cup was the 67th season of the Bulgarian Cup. Levski Sofia won the competition, beating Litex Lovech 1–0 after extra time in the final at the Beroe Stadium in Stara Zagora.

First round
In this round entered winners from the preliminary rounds together with the teams from B Group.

|-
!colspan=3 style="background-color:#D0F0C0;" |4 October 2006

|}

Second round
This round featured winners from the First Round and all teams from A Group. 

|-
!colspan=3 style="background-color:#D0F0C0;" |7 November 2006

|-
!colspan=3 style="background-color:#D0F0C0;" |8 November 2006

|-
|}

Third round

|-
!colspan=3 style="background-color:#D0F0C0;" |30 November 2006

|}

Quarter-finals

|-
!colspan=5 style="background-color:#D0F0C0;" |11 April 2007

|}

Semi-finals

|-
!colspan=5 style="background-color:#D0F0C0;" |9 May 2007

|}

Final

Details

References

2006-07
2006–07 domestic association football cups
Cup